An archbishop is a type of priest. Most archbishops are referred to in terms of the area for which they are responsible.

Archbishop may also refer to:

 "The Archbishop", an episode of Blackadder
 Archbishop (chess), a Fairy Chess piece
 Archbishop (dinosaur), a fossil dinosaur which has yet to be properly identified

See also
 All articles beginning with "Archbishop"